Alturas Lake is an alpine lake in Blaine County, Idaho, United States, in the Sawtooth Valley in the Sawtooth National Recreation Area. Alturas Lake can be accessed from State Highway 75 via Sawtooth National Forest road 205.

In the southern section of the Sawtooth Valley, Alturas Lake is the second largest lake in Sawtooth National Recreation Area and has easy access around its northern shore, several campgrounds, and private camps. Leah Lake and Logjam Lake are upstream of Alturas Lake.

The lake took its name from the now-defunct Alturas County, Idaho.

See also

 Perkins Lake
 List of lakes of the Sawtooth Mountains (Idaho)
 Sawtooth National Forest
 Sawtooth National Recreation Area
 Sawtooth Range (Idaho)

References

External links
 Alturas Lake

Lakes of Idaho
Lakes of Blaine County, Idaho
Glacial lakes of the United States
Glacial lakes of the Sawtooth National Forest